The Ulster Railway was a railway company operating in Ulster, Ireland. The company was incorporated in 1836 and merged with two other railway companies in 1876 to form the Great Northern Railway (Ireland).

History
The Ulster Railway was authorised by an Act of the UK Parliament in 1836 and construction began in March 1837.

In 1836 a Railway Commission recommended that railways in Ireland be built to  broad gauge. The Ulster Railway complied with this recommendation but the Dublin and Drogheda Railway (D&D) did not.

This connected the D&D with the Ulster Railway, thus completing the main line between Dublin and Belfast.

The Ulster Railway operated three lines that remained in the ownership of separate companies: the Portadown, Dungannon and Omagh Junction Railway (PD&O), the Banbridge, Lisburn and Belfast Railway (BLBR) and the Dublin and Antrim Junction Railway (D&AJR).

In 1876 the Ulster Railway merged with the INW and the Northern Railway of Ireland (formed by a merger of the D&D and the D&BJct the previous year) to form the Great Northern Railway (Ireland).

Preserved stock 

One example of Ulster Railway rolling stock has survived. The body of No. 33, built as a family saloon in 1862 and withdrawn in the 1920s having passed into GNR hands, is preserved at the Downpatrick and County Down Railway. It is currently on display in the Carriage Gallery, and it is hoped that it will be fully restored in the future.

References

Sources and further reading

External links
 1843 Timetable for Belfast and Portadown, from Bradshaw's Railway Monthly

Railway companies established in 1836
Railway companies disestablished in 1876
Irish gauge railways
Great Northern Railway (Ireland)
Closed railways in Northern Ireland
Closed railways in Ireland
Defunct railway companies of Ireland
Transport in County Antrim
Transport in County Armagh
Transport in County Down
Transport in County Monaghan
6 ft 2 in gauge railways in Ireland
1836 establishments in Ireland
1876 disestablishments in Ireland
British companies disestablished in 1876
British companies established in 1836